Herophilos (335–280 BC), sometimes Latinised Herophilus, was a Greek physician regarded as one of the earliest anatomists. Born in Chalcedon, he spent the majority of his life in Alexandria. He was the first scientist to systematically perform scientific dissections of human cadavers. He recorded his findings in over nine works, which are now all lost. The early Christian author Tertullian states that Herophilos vivisected at least 600 live prisoners; however, this account has been disputed by many historians. He is often seen as the father of anatomy.

Life
Herophilos was born in Chalcedon in Asia Minor (now Kadıköy, Turkey), c. 335 BC. Not much is known about his early life other than he moved to Alexandria at a fairly young age to begin his schooling.

As an adult Herophilos was a teacher, and an author of at least nine texts ranging from his book titled, On Pulses, which explored the flow of blood from the heart through the arteries, to his book titled Midwifery, which discussed duration and phases of childbirth. In Alexandria, he practiced dissections, often publicly so that he could explain what he was doing to those who were fascinated. Erasistratus was his contemporary.  Together, they worked at a medical school in Alexandria that is said to have drawn people from all over the ancient world due to Herophilos's fame.

His works are lost but were much quoted by Galen in the second century AD. Herophilos was the first scientist to systematically perform scientific dissections of human cadavers. Dissections of human cadavers were banned in most places at the time, except for Alexandria. Celsus in De Medicina and the church leader Tertullian state that he vivisected at least 600 live prisoners, though there is no direct evidence for this.

After the death of Herophilos in 280 BC, his anatomical findings lived on in the works of other important physicians, notably Galen. Even though dissections were performed in the following centuries and medieval times, only a few insights were added. Dissecting with the purpose to gain knowledge about human anatomy started again in early modern times (Vesalius), more than 1600 years after Herophilos's death.

Medicine
Herophilos emphasised the use of the experimental method in medicine, for he considered it essential to found knowledge on empirical bases. He was a forerunner of the Empiric school of medicine, founded by Herophilos's pupil Philinus of Cos, which combined Herophilos's empirical impulses with critical tools borrowed from Pyrrhonist philosophy. However, the Empirics found Herophilos wanting, mounting two chief attacks against him:

 that anatomy was useless to the therapeutic and clinical practice of medicine, as demonstrated by Herophilos's own acceptance of humoral pathology.
 it was useless and epistemologically unsound to try to find causal explanations from the evident to the non-evident.

Conventional medicine of the time revolved around the theory of the four humors in which an imbalance between bile, black bile, phlegm, and blood led to sickness or disease. Veins were believed to be filled with blood and a mixture of air and water. Through dissections, Herophilus was able to deduce that veins carried only blood. After studying the flow of blood, he was able to differentiate between arteries and veins. He noticed that as blood flowed through arteries, they pulsed or rhythmically throbbed. He worked out standards for measuring a pulse and could use these standards to aid him in diagnosing sicknesses or diseases. To measure this pulse, he made use of a water clock.

Herophilos's work on blood and its movements led him to study and analyse the brain. He proposed that the brain housed the intellect rather than the heart.  He was the first person to differentiate between the cerebrum and the cerebellum, and to place individual importance on each portion. He looked more in depth into the network of nerves located in the cranium.

Herophilos was particularly interested in the eye. He described the optic nerve for seeing and the oculomotor nerve for eye movements. Through his dissection of the eye, he discovered its different sections and layers: the "skin" of the eyeball comprising the cornea (the clear part at the front of the eye through which light begins to be focussed into the eye) and sclera (the white of the eye), the iris (the colored part of the eye surrounding the pupil), the retina (containing the cells converting light into neural activity), and the choroid (a layer between the retina and the sclera comprising connective tissue and blood vessels nourishing the retina). Herophilos used the term retiform to describe the retina, from its resemblance to a casting net, giving the origin of the modern term.

Further study of the cranium led Herophilos to describe the calamus scriptorius, which he believed was the seat of the human soul.  Analysis of the nerves in the cranium allowed him to differentiate between nerves and blood vessels and to discover the differences between motor and sensory nerves. He believed that the sensory and motor nerves shot out from the brain and that the neural transmissions occurred by means of pneuma.  Part of Herophilos's beliefs about the human body involved the pneuma, which he believed was a substance that flowed through the arteries along with the blood. To make this consistent with medical beliefs at the time, Herophilos stated that diseases occurred when an excess of one of the four humors impeded the pneuma from reaching the brain.

Herophilos also introduced many other scientific terms used to this day to describe anatomical phenomena. He was among the first to introduce the notion of conventional terminology, as opposed to use of "natural names", using terms he created to describe the objects of study, naming them for the first time. A confluence of sinuses in the skull was originally named torcular Herophili after him.  Torcular is a Latin translation of Herophilos's label, ληνός - lenos, 'wine vat' or 'wine press'. He also named the duodenum, which is part of the small intestine. Other areas of his anatomical study include the liver, the pancreas, and the alimentary tract, as well as the salivary glands and genitalia.

Herophilos is credited with learning extensively about the physiology of the female reproductive system.  In his book Midwifery, he discussed phases and duration of pregnancy as well as causes for difficult childbirth.  The aim of this work was to help midwives and other doctors of the time more fully understand the process of procreation and pregnancy. He is also credited with the discovery of the ovum,  and was the first to make a scientific description of what would later be called Skene's gland, for which in 2001 the term female prostate was accepted as a second term.

Herophilos believed that exercise and a healthy diet were integral to an individual's bodily health. He once said that "when health is absent, wisdom cannot reveal itself, art cannot become manifest, strength cannot be exerted, wealth is useless, and reason is powerless".

See also
Timeline of medicine and medical technology
Alcmaeon of Croton

References

Sources
 von Staden H. (ed. trans.) Herophilos: The Art of Medicine in Early Alexandria. Cambridge University Press, 1989 
Simon Hornblower and Anthony Spawford, "Herophilos", The Oxford Classical Dictionary. (New York: Oxford University Press, 1999) 699.
"Herophilus", Encyclopedia of World Biography, Supplement Vol. 25 Thomson Gale. (Michigan: Gale).
Adrian Wills, "Herophilus, Erasistratus, and the birth of neuroscience", The Lancet. (November 13, 1999): 1719 Expanded Academic ASAP. Gale, 30 Nov. 2008.
"On the Localisation of the Functions of the Brain with Special Reference to the Faculty of Language", Anthropological Review, Vol. 6, (Oct., 1868) 336.
 Galen. On the natural faculties. Brock A. J. (trans.) Heinemann, London 1916. p. xii, 233

Further reading

History of neuroscience
Greek anatomists
Ancient Chalcedonians
4th-century BC Greek physicians
335 BC births
280 BC deaths
Ancient ophthalmologists
3rd-century BC Greek physicians